Brian James Hoyle (born 25 August 1963) is an English cricketer.  Hoyle is a left-handed batsman.  He was born at Worksop, Nottinghamshire.

Hoyle made his debut for Herefordshire in the Minor Counties Championship against Shropshire in 1995.  He played 2 further Championship matches for the county, against Cornwall in 1995 and against the same opposition in 1997.

Hoyle represented the Somerset Cricket Board in a single List A match against Norfolk in the 2nd round of the 2002 Cheltenham & Gloucester Trophy, which was held in 2001 at Manor Park, Horsford.  In his only List A match, he scored 11 runs and took a single catch in the field.

He currently plays club cricket for Taunton St Andrews Cricket Club in the West of England Premier League.

References

External links
Brian Hoyle at Cricinfo
Brian Hoyle at CricketArchive

1963 births
Living people
Sportspeople from Worksop
Cricketers from Nottinghamshire
English cricketers
Herefordshire cricketers
Somerset Cricket Board cricketers